Heinrich Vogt may refer to:
 Heinrich Vogt (neurologist)
 Heinrich Vogt (astronomer)